License plates of Honduras are issued by the Honduran Secretaría de Obras Públicas, Transporte y Vivienda (SOPTRAVI, the Ministry of Public Works, Transport and Living) and identify motor vehicles in the country.

Honduran license plates are white and feature an outline of the map of Honduras in a variety of colors according to the class of vehicle registered. All license plates bear the slogan "Cuidemos los Bosques" along the top, ("Take Care of the Forests" in English) and "Honduras, C.A." along the bottom. They are the same size as North American license plates, 6 by 12 inches.

The initial letter or (two letters) identify the class of vehicle (see table), followed by a four- or five-digit serial number. Personal, commercial and trailer tags also have a one- or two-letter serial letters. The letter Ñ is included in the alphabet used for the serial letters.

Light truck license plates in the PP format do not have the map of Honduras in the background.

Current
In October 2018, when the Instituto de la Propiedad (IP) finally revealed the new design of license plates (similar to those of Mercosur), the typeface used is FE-Schrift. It became available starting at the end of 2018. Types of license plates in motor vehicles will no longer be available, which allow exclusive now code H. The B code is also for use for its entire of motorcycles. It replaced the Cuidemos los Bosques ("Take Care of the Forests" in English) lettering with Centro América ("Central America" in English) lettering sited on the bottom while Honduras on the top corner. It also fitted with a QR code on the left bottom, black and a blue band at the top that shows the name of the country, and a sticker on the right bottom and windshield.

Neighboring Guatemala introduced a similar car license plate in January 2021.

See also
Vehicle registration plates of Guatemala
Vehicle registration plates of the Mercosur

References

Honduras
Honduras transport-related lists
Transport in Honduras